Refik Koraltan (1889 – June 17, 1974) was a Turkish politician, having served as the Speaker of the Grand National Assembly of Turkey (TBMM) from May 22, 1950 to May 27, 1960.

Biography
Koraltan was born in Divriği, Sivas Province, in 1889, the son of Ali Bey, a local leading citizen. Although he was known as Refik Koraltan, the name on his birth record was Bekir Refik.  After completing the primary and middle education in Divriği, Koraltan studied at Istanbul Mercan High School. He graduated from Istanbul Faculty of Law in 1914.

Political career

Koraltan entered public service as an assistant prosecutor and became the Attorney General of Karaman in 1915. He was assigned as police inspector on March 2, 1918 and charged as Chief of Police of Trabzon on May 29, 1918. During this duty, he facilitated the establishment of the "Society of Defence of the National Rights to counteract the Pontus Rum Organizations" that started to appear after the end of World War I.

He was elected in the TBMM as the Deputy of Konya in 1920 and reelected from the same city for three more terms.

He served as Governor of Bursa Province from 1939 to 1942.

He served briefly as governor of Konya Province before returning to the parliament six more terms. In 1946, he quit from the CHP and formed the Democratic Party together with Celal Bayar, Adnan Menderes and Mehmet Fuat Köprülü. Finally, he served as the Speaker of the TBMM from May 22, 1950 until May 27, 1960.

Koraltan died on June 17, 1974 in Istanbul, and is buried in Ankara.

Personal life
Koraltan was married with four children.

References

Sources
 Ministry of Culture and Tourism, the General Directorate of Cultural Heritages and Museums

1889 births
1974 deaths
People from Divriği
Republican People's Party (Turkey) politicians
Democrat Party (Turkey, 1946–1961) politicians
20th-century Turkish politicians
Istanbul University Faculty of Law alumni
Turkish civil servants
Turkish jurists
Deputies of Konya
Speakers of the Parliament of Turkey
Governors (Turkey)
Governors of Bursa
Deputies of Mersin
Burials at Cebeci Asri Cemetery
Grand Crosses 1st class of the Order of Merit of the Federal Republic of Germany